Fish Hooks, a Disney Channel Original Series, premiered on September 3, 2010 and concluded on April 4, 2014, after airing a total of 110 episodes across three seasons.

Series overview

Season 1 (2010–2011)

Season 2 (2011–2013)

Season 3 (2013–2014)

Notes

References 

General references that apply to most episodes

External links 
 

Fish Hooks
Fish Hooks